is an NHK announcer.

Education
Asano was born in Tokyo, Japan. She graduated from the University of the Sacred Heart in Tokyo in March 2016, and was hired by NHK in April 2016.

Career
She started her career at NHK Matsue Branch in Shimane Prefecture, and was moved to NHK Sapporo Branch in Sapporo, Hokkaido in 2018. She has been an anchor for Hokkaido's infotainment program Hokkaido Close-up since April 5, 2019. Also, she sometimes appears as correspondent in news programs broadcast from Hokkaido.

In March 2020, Asano was relocated to the Tokyo Announcement Room of NHK to host local news program Shutoken Network. She has been host for NHK's weekly geological program Bura Tamori since April 2020, taking over from Risa Hayashida.

On February 9, 2022, NHK announced that Asano was supposed to resign from the assistant job of Bura Tamori in April, from which she will be a host for Family History. She will still be a correspondent of Shutoken Network.

See also
 Tamori

References

External links
 Rika Asano, NHK Announcement Room

1994 births
Living people
University of the Sacred Heart (Japan) alumni
Japanese announcers
Japanese television personalities
Japanese television presenters
Japanese women television presenters
People from Tokyo